Salh District is a district of the Taiz Governorate, Yemen. As of 2003, the district had a population of 198,169 people.

References

Districts of Taiz Governorate